Leonard Alan Rapping (April 16, 1934 – October 1, 1991) was an American economist, who advised several Federal agencies. He also helped develop theories on the interplay of human behavior and business cycles. He was most famous for his work with Robert E. Lucas which laid the foundations for real business cycle theory, which holds that the financial expectations of business executives and consumers help mold their decisions, therefore influencing economic outcomes. That theory helped analyze the 1970s phenomenon of "stagflation", in which prices rose despite economic stagnation and recession.

At the time of his death, Rapping was completing a book for the 20th Century Fund, called The Wage Crunch, on the social and economic effects of the slowdown in American wages in recent years.

Career
Early in his career, Rapping held a laissez-faire view of a government's role in the economy but grew to believe capitalism needed regulation. He was highly critical of the supply-side policies of the Reagan administration, calling it a policy that "transfers money from the poor to the rich."

As a consultant and researcher, Rapping worked for the Rand Corporation, the Federal Bureau of the Budget, and the U.S. departments of Defense; Justice; Labor; and Transportation. He was with the Center for Naval Analysis, and Northwestern University's Transportation Center. Shortly before his death, Rapping served as Director of the National Academy of Science's Panel on Technology and Employment.

Rapping was Professor of Economics at the University of Massachusetts Amherst. Before that, he served on the faculty of Graduate School of Industrial Administration, Carnegie-Mellon University. He also taught at Brandeis University, University of Notre Dame, the University of Nevada, San Fernando State College, and UCLA.

Rapping obtained his bachelor's degree from UCLA, 1956, Phi Beta Kappa, Master of Arts, University of Chicago, 1958 and Doctor of Philosophy in Economics, University of Chicago, 1961.

Family 
The son of Joseph and Rose, Rapping was born in Indianapolis. He had a sister, Hanna Lee Rapping Jutovsky, and a brother, Richard. From his marriage to Elayne Antler Rapping  Rapping had two children: his daughter, Alison Rapping, a leader and organizer in the social justice nonprofit sector; his son, Jonathan Rapping, a criminal defense attorney, and founder of Gideon's Promise. He married Judith Alt Wilson in 1980, becoming stepfather to her daughter and son.

Selected publications

References

1934 births
1991 deaths
20th-century American economists
University of California, Los Angeles alumni
University of Chicago alumni
Carnegie Mellon University faculty
University of Massachusetts faculty